The Journal of Carcinogenesis is a peer-reviewed open access medical journal published by Medknow Publications on behalf of the Carcinogenesis Press. The journal covers research in oncology.

Abstracting and indexing 
The journal is abstracted and indexed in: Abstracts on Hygiene and Communicable Diseases, CAB Abstracts, EBSCO databases, Excerpta Medica/EMBASE, Expanded Academic ASAP, Pubmed Central, and Scopus.

External links 
 

Open access journals
Quarterly journals
English-language journals
Medknow Publications academic journals
Oncology journals
Publications established in 2002